Edgewood is a census-designated place (CDP) in Ashtabula County, Ohio, United States. The population was 4,432 at the 2010 census.

Geography
Edgewood is located at  (41.873274, -80.757853).

Demographics

As of the census of 2000, there were 4,762 people, 2,048 households, and 1,357 families residing in the CDP. The population density was 705.7 people per square mile (272.4/km2). There were 2,157 housing units at an average density of 319.7/sq mi (123.4/km2). The racial makeup of the CDP was 96.77% White, 1.26% African American, 0.13% Native American, 0.71% Asian, 0.23% from other races, and 0.90% from two or more races. Hispanic or Latino people of any race were 1.13% of the population. 21.6% were of German, 12.4% Italian, 10.8% English, 9.6% Irish, 7.6% American and 5.6% Finnish ancestry according to Census 2000.

There were 2,048 households, out of which 26.5% had children under the age of 18 living with them, 51.1% were married couples living together, 11.8% had a female householder with no husband present, and 33.7% were non-families. 29.0% of all households were made up of individuals, and 12.4% had someone living alone who was 65 years of age or older. The average household size was 2.31 and the average family size was 2.82.

In the CDP, the population was spread out, with 21.5% under the age of 18, 7.2% from 18 to 24, 27.5% from 25 to 44, 25.9% from 45 to 64, and 17.8% who were 65 years of age or older. The median age was 41 years. For every 100 females, there were 93.3 males. For every 100 females age 18 and over, there were 92.6 males.

The median income for a household in the CDP is $40,170, and the median income for a family was $46,470. Males had a median income of $36,319 versus $21,985 for females. The per capita income for the CDP was $19,415. About 3.1% of families and 6.8% of the population were below the poverty line, including 5.5% of those under age 18 and 7.9% of those age 65 or over.

See also

 List of census-designated places in Ohio

References

External links

Census-designated places in Ashtabula County, Ohio
Census-designated places in Ohio
Finnish-American culture in Ohio